Paula Kubová (born  in Liptovský Mikuláš) is a Slovak female volleyball player. She has been part of the Slovakia women's national volleyball team since 2007, having played in the 2007 Women's European Volleyball Championship and won a silver medal at the 2016 Women's European Volleyball League.

At club level she plays for Austrian club SG VB NÖ Sokol/Post.

Clubs
  VK SKM Liptovský Hrádok (?–?)
  VTC Pezinok (2005–2006)
  Doprastav Bratislava (2006–2010)
  TJ Sokol Frýdek-Místek (2010–2011)
  VK Spišská Nová Ves (2011–2013)
  TJ Sokol Frýdek-Místek (2013–2015)
  VK UP Olomouc (2015–2016)
  SG VB NÖ Sokol/Post (2016–present)

Awards

National team
 2016 Women's European Volleyball League —  Silver medal

Club
 2005–06 Slovak Cup —  Silver medal (with VTC Pezinok)
 2007–08 Slovak Cup —  Gold medal (with Doprastav Bratislava)
 2007–08 Slovak Championship —  Bronze medal (with Doprastav Bratislava)
 2008–09 Slovak Cup —  Gold medal (with Doprastav Bratislava)
 2008–09 Slovak Championship —  Gold medal (with Doprastav Bratislava)
 2009–10 Slovak Cup —  Silver medal (with Doprastav Bratislava)
 2009–10 Slovak Championship —  Bronze medal (with Doprastav Bratislava)
 2014–15 Czech Championship —  Bronze medal (with TJ Sokol Frýdek-Místek)
 2015–16 Czech Championship —  Silver medal (with VK UP Olomouc)
 2016–17 Austrian Championship —  Gold medal (with VB NÖ Sokol/Post)

References

External links
 Profile at CEV

1986 births
Living people
Sportspeople from Liptovský Mikuláš
Slovak women's volleyball players
Slovak expatriate sportspeople in Austria
Slovak expatriate sportspeople in the Czech Republic